The Thika dam is a 63 m high, 458 m crest length earthfill dam on the Thika River near Ndakaini, 50 km north of Nairobi, Kenya. The reservoir has a storage capacity of 70 million cubic meters and serves for drinking water supply. Water is treated at the Ngethu treatment works. The dam has increased the reliability of water supply to Nairobi, which suffered water shortages during the dry season before construction of the dam was completed in 1994. The dam has been financed by the African Development Bank, the World Bank, the European Investment Bank and the Kenyan government. Its construction had been delayed because of difficulties in land acquisition, leading to cost overruns. During construction the dam design has been modified to allow it to withstand a 1:10,000-year flood and to improve dam safety.

References

Dams in Kenya
Earth-filled dams
Dams completed in 1994